The 2017–18 Palestine Cup is the 2017–18 season of the top football cup in Palestine.

There are two competitions, the Gaza Strip Cup for clubs in the Gaza Strip, and the West Bank Cup for clubs in the West Bank. A two-legged Palestine Cup final is played between the cup winners of the Gaza Strip and the West Bank.

Gaza Strip Cup

Preliminary round 1

|-
!colspan=3|3 Jan 2018

|}

Preliminary round 2

|-
!colspan=3|7 Jan 2018

|-
!colspan=3|8 Jan 2018

|}

Round of 32

|-
!colspan=3|2 Apr 2018

|-
!colspan=3|3 Apr 2018

|-
!colspan=3|4 Apr 2018

|}

Round of 16

|-
!colspan=3|9 Apr 2018

|-
!colspan=3|10 Apr 2018

|}

Quarter-finals

|-
!colspan=3|16 Apr 2018

|-
!colspan=3|17 Apr 2018

|}

Semi-finals

|-
!colspan=3|23 Apr 2018

|}

Final

|-
!colspan=3|30 Apr 2018

|}

West Bank Cup

Preliminary round 1

|-
!colspan=3|15 Dec 2017

|-
!colspan=3|16 Dec 2017

|-
!colspan=3|18 Dec 2017

|-
!colspan=3|19 Dec 2017

|}

Preliminary round 2

|-
!colspan=3|22 Dec 2017

|-
!colspan=3|23 Dec 2017

|-
!colspan=3|26 Dec 2017

|-
!colspan=3|27 Dec 2017

|-
!colspan=3|29 Dec 2017

|-
!colspan=3|30 Dec 2017

|-
!colspan=3|3 Jan 2018

|}

Round of 32

|-
!colspan=3|16 Jan 2018

|-
!colspan=3|17 Jan 2018

|-
!colspan=3|18 Jan 2018

|-
!colspan=3|20 Jan 2018

|}

Round of 16

|-
!colspan=3|12 Feb 2018

|-
!colspan=3|13 Feb 2018

|}

Quarter-finals

|-
!colspan=3|11 Apr 2018

|}

Semi-finals

|-
!colspan=3|18 Apr 2018

|}

Final

|-
!colspan=3|24 May 2018

|}

Palestine Cup Final

See also
2017–18 West Bank Premier League
2017–18 Gaza Strip Premier League

References

Palestine Cup
Palestine
Cup